The women's minimumweight boxing competitions at the 2022 Commonwealth Games in Birmingham, England took place between July 29 and August 7 at National Exhibition Centre Hall 4. Minimumweights were limited to those boxers weighing between 45 kg but less than 48 kilograms.

Like all Commonwealth boxing events, the competition was a straight single-elimination tournament. Both semifinal losers were awarded bronze medals, so no boxers competed again after their first loss. Bouts consisted of three rounds of three minutes each, with one-minute breaks between rounds.

Schedule
The schedule is as follows:

Results
The draw is as follows:

Bracket

References

External link
Results
 

Boxing at the 2022 Commonwealth Games